Their Complete General Recordings is a 1996 album of 1941 recordings by the Almanac Singers.

Reception

Bruce Eder, writing for Allmusic wrote of the compilation "there isn't a bad song here" but about the liner notes commented "The notes are the only flaw, presenting an oversimplified history of the Almanacs that is a bit vague on details."

Track listing

Personnel
Woody Guthrie – guitar, harmonica, vocal
Pete Hawes – vocal, possibly guitar
Lee Hays – vocal
Millard Lampell – vocal
Pete Seeger as Pete Bowers – banjo, recorder, vocal

References 

Almanac Singers albums
Woody Guthrie albums
1996 compilation albums
MCA Records compilation albums